Rodrigo Vasconcelos Oliveira (born 11 February 1994), simply known as Rodrigo, is a Brazilian footballer who plays for Tombense as a defensive midfielder.

Club career
Born in Ituiutaba, Minas Gerais, Rodrigo graduated with Goiás' youth setup, and made his senior debuts while on loan at Aparecidense in 2012. In 2014, he was promoted to the main squad by manager Claudinei Oliveira.

On 15 May 2014 Rodrigo made his first team – and Série A – debut, coming on as a late substitute in a 2–0 home win against Botafogo. After the departure of Amaral to Palmeiras, he was made a starter ahead of the 2015 season.

References

External links

1994 births
Living people
Sportspeople from Minas Gerais
Brazilian footballers
Association football midfielders
Campeonato Brasileiro Série A players
Campeonato Brasileiro Série B players
Campeonato Brasileiro Série C players
Campeonato Brasileiro Série D players
Goiás Esporte Clube players
Associação Atlética Aparecidense players
Tombense Futebol Clube players
Sociedade Esportiva Palmeiras players
Sport Club do Recife players
Atlético Clube Goianiense players
Esporte Clube Juventude players
Paraná Clube players